ʿAbd al-Salam Mohammed ʿArif al-Jumayli (21 March 1921 – 13 April 1966) was the second president of Iraq from 1963 until his death in a plane crash in 1966. He played a leading role in the 14 July Revolution, in which the Hashemite monarchy was overthrown on 14 July 1958.

1958 coup and conflict with Qasim
Along with Abdel Karim Qasim and other Iraqi military officers, Arif was a member of the clandestine organisation, the Free Officers of Iraq. Like Qasim, Arif served with distinction in the otherwise unsuccessful 1948 Arab-Israeli conflict, where he captured Jenin in what is now the West Bank part of Palestine. During the summer of 1958, Prime Minister Nuri as-Sa'id ordered Iraqi troops under Arif to aid Jordan, as part of an agreement of the Arab Federation. Instead, however, he led his army units into Baghdad and on 14 July launched a coup against the Hashemite monarchy. Qasim formed a government under the newly proclaimed republic and Arif, his chief aide, was appointed deputy prime minister, interior minister, and deputy commander-in-chief of the armed forces.

Almost immediately however, tensions rose between the pan-Arabist Arif and Iraqi nationalist Qasim who also had the support of the Iraqi Communist Party. The former supported a union with the United Arab Republic (UAR)—composed of Egypt and Syria—under president Gamal Abdel Nasser, but the latter opposed merging with the UAR. As a result, the two leaders engaged in a power struggle, ending in Qasim prevailing and the removal of Arif from his positions on 12 September. He was appointed the low-ranking post of ambassador to Bonn. Arif refused to take up the post and upon returning to Baghdad on 4 November, he was promptly arrested for plotting against the state. He was sentenced to death along with Rashid Ali al-Gaylani in February 1959. Qasim had him released in November 1961.

President of Iraq

Qasim was overthrown on 8 February 1963, by a coalition of Ba'athists, army units, and other pan-Arabist groups. Arif had previously been selected as the leader of the Iraqi Revolutionary Command Council and after the coup he was elected president of Iraq due to his popularity. Qasim pleaded with Arif to be exiled instead of executed and reminded Arif that he had commuted his death sentence two years before. Nonetheless, Arif demanded that Qasim swear to the Qur'an that it was he, Arif, who had been the real leader of the 1958 coup. Qasim refused and was consequently executed.

Although he was chosen as president, more power was held by the Ba'athist secretary general Ali Salih al-Sa'di and Ba'athist prime minister, Ahmed Hassan al-Bakr. Following a Ba'athist-led coup in Syria in March 1963, Arif entered his country into unification talks with Syria and Egypt (which had split from the UAR in 1961). After a fallout with Nasser in July, the Ba'athist government of Iraq removed all non-Ba'athist members from the cabinet, despite Arif's support for Nasser. On 18 November Arif, with the support of disaffected elements in the military, took advantage of a split between the Ba'ath—which weakened the party—and ousted their members from the government. Arif formed a new cabinet, retaining a few Ba'athists, but mostly made up of Nasserist army officers and technocrats. He maintained his presidency and appointed himself chief-of-staff. A month later he handed the latter post to his brother General Abdul Rahman Arif, and the premiership to his confidant Lieutenant-General Tahir Yahya. In the fall of 1964, the Ba'ath attempted to depose Arif, but failed when their plot was unveiled. Arif had the conspirators, including Saddam Hussein, arrested.

On 26 May 1964, Arif established the Joint Presidency Council with Egypt. On 14 July the anniversary of the revolution, he declared the establishment of the Arab Socialist Union (ASU) of Iraq, commending it as the "threshold of the building of the unity of the Arab nation under Arab socialism." It was nearly identical in structure the ASU of Egypt and like in Egypt, many of the Arab nationalist parties were dissolved and absorbed by the ASU. Also, all banks and over thirty major Iraqi businesses were nationalized. Arif undertook these measures in an effort to bring Iraq closer with Egypt to help foster unity and on 20 December plans for union were announced. Despite this, in July 1965, the Nasserist ministers resigned from the Iraqi cabinet. President Arif played a major role in Iraq construction and developing its infrastructure.

Death
On 13 April 1966, Arif was killed in the crash of Iraqi Air Force de Havilland DH.104 Dove 1, RF392, in southern Iraq, and was replaced as president by his brother Abdul Rahman. Reports at the time said Arif had died in a helicopter accident. Abd al-Rahman al-Bazzaz became acting president for three days, and a power struggle for the presidency occurred. In the first meeting of the Defense Council and cabinet to elect a president, Al-Bazzaz needed a two-thirds majority to win the presidency. Al-Bazzaz was unsuccessful, and Abdul Rahman Arif was elected president. He was viewed by army officers as weaker and easier to manipulate than his brother.

Family
On 13 December 2004, Arif's daughter, Sana Abdul Salam, and her husband, Wamith Abdul Razzak Said Alkadiry, were shot dead in their home in Baghdad by unknown assailants. Rafal Alkadiry, their 22-year-old son, was kidnapped, and later killed.

References

Bibliography

 
 
 

20th-century rulers in Asia
1921 births
1966 deaths
Arab Socialist Union (Iraq) politicians
Field marshals of Iraq
Iraqi Arab nationalists
Iraqi revolutionaries
Iraqi socialists
Iraqi Sunni Muslims
Iraqi prisoners sentenced to death
Interior ministers of Iraq
People from Baghdad
Presidents of Iraq
People convicted of treason against Iraq
Prisoners sentenced to death by Iraq
Recipients of Iraqi presidential pardons
State leaders killed in aviation accidents or incidents
Victims of aviation accidents or incidents in Iraq
Victims of aviation accidents or incidents in 1966
Muslim socialists
Iraqi Military Academy alumni